"Selfish" is a song by American rapper Future for his sixth studio album, Hndrxx (2017), featuring Barbadian singer Rihanna, the song was released as the lead single from Hndrxx on February 28, 2017. The track was produced by Detail, Major Seven and Mantra.

Composition
"Selfish" draws influences from the R&B and pop music genres. Future's voice is set with Auto-Tune.

Charts

Weekly charts

Year-end charts

Certifications

References

2017 songs
2017 singles
Future (rapper) songs
Rihanna songs
Songs written by Future (rapper)
Songs written by Detail (record producer)
Songs written by Rihanna
Song recordings produced by Detail (record producer)